The Seal of the State of Rhode Island features a blue field with a golden maritime anchor as its central image below the phrase "HOPE".  The anchor has been used as a symbol for Rhode Island since the colony's founding in 1636, well before the region claimed statehood.

History
Rhode Island was founded in 1636 by Roger Williams, a Christian minister, Anne Hutchinson, and others seeking religious freedom from persecution in Massachusetts and Europe. The seal's words and emblems were likely inspired by the biblical phrase "hope we have as an anchor of the soul," found in Hebrews, Verse 6:18-19. After Roger Williams received an official charter in England in 1644, the word "Hope" was placed over the seal's anchor and still remains. The outer circle of the seal reads Seal of the State of Rhode Island 1636.

Besides the seal, Roger Williams also used Biblical virtues when he named Providence, Rhode Island, and the islands in Narragansett Bay: Prudence Island, Patience Island, Hope Island, and Despair Island.

Legal enactment
The seal has been adopted by successive Rhode Island government authorities since 1644.  The current (2021) General Laws enactment asserts:

§ 42-4-2  State seal. – There shall continue to be one seal for the public use of the state; the form of an anchor shall be engraved thereon; the motto thereof shall be the word "Hope"; and in a circle around the outside shall be engraved with the words, "Seal of the State of Rhode Island, 1636".

Historical seals

Government seals

See also

Flag of Rhode Island

References

External links
Origins of the Seal of the State of Rhode Island and Providence Plantations
The Seal, the Arms and the Flag of Rhode Island, 1913 booklet by the Rhode Island Historical Society

Symbols of Rhode Island
Rhode Island
Rhode Island culture
Official seals of places in Rhode Island